Sittin' In may refer to:

 Sittin' In (Loggins and Messina album), 1971
 Sittin' In (Dizzy Gillespie album), 1957
 Sittin' In With, a jazz label which issued some recordings under the name Sittin' In